The Naiza (lance) multiple rocket launcher was developed by Israeli Military Industries (IMI) for the Kazakhstan Ministry of Defense. It is similar to the LYNX multiple rocket launcher.

The Naiza MLRS uses interchangeable rocket pods. It is capable of firing 122-mm Grad rockets, 160-mm IMI LAR-160s, 200-mm IMI EXTRAs, and 220-mm BM-27 Uragans.

References

Wheeled self-propelled rocket launchers
Self-propelled artillery of Kazakhstan
Multiple rocket launchers
Modular rocket launchers